Pakistani craft has a long tradition and history. It is a traditional work or art of Pakistani people to produce, design or shape objects by using simple tools or simply by hand. It is generally produced by an individual, group or independent artists, and while it is an ancient custom, artists process traditional craft material such as brass, wood, clay, textiles, paper, or other embroidery material to create handmade items. Stone carving, sandstone, onyx, metalwork, pottery, and ajraks are commonly used techniques and materials to work upon handicrafts.

History 
Pakistan has a diverse history of handicrafts. The entire timeline of its culture was studied through ages. However, it lacks actual dates and origin despite flourishing the great Indus Valley civilisation through Pakistan. On the other hand, experts claim that 80% of South Asian craftsmanship are still found in Pakistan, and the former craftsmen were mostly from the different regions of the country. People of Karachi used to sell "jewellery, ornaments, textiles, furniture, leather goods" and other handmade items in markets that gives an impression of its historical existence.

Crafts

Multan is one of the oldest regions in Pakistan where artisans create or decorate objects traditionally. Camel skin is used to produce camel-lamps, whereas camel bone is used to produce jewellery and decorative pieces. Wood crafts and blue pottery are commonly used by the artisans. "Multani Khussa", a type of shoes is created by crafting leather. Hyderabad, Sindh is particularly producing wooden furniture, sports goods and embroidery items.

The artisans of Sillanwali town of Punjab, Pakistan produce several type of jars which are created from wooden candy and other traditional containers. Unlike other cities of Pakistan, it is known for woodwork handicrafts.

Matki earthen pot is one of the handicrafts of Pakistan, especially in Rawalpindi and Islamabad are the main regions in country where people use and craft "matki" pots.

The traditional blankets or textiles are mainly created by Sindhi artisans. They use simple tools to produce Ralli quilt.

Pakistani clay moulding dates back to British raj when some of its regions, especially "Leh Nullah" artisan used to create clay utensils. However, this tradition in modern-era has been disappeared. Before the Partition of India, people used to produce and sell clay utensils at the banks of river "Leh Nullah". Most of artisans were Hindus who later left the country and migrated to India.

Truck art is one of the prominent traditional techniques used to decorate vehicles such as trucks, lotteries, rickshaws with poetic  calligraphy. It was used by the people before 1950s. However, it became known in 1970s when Euro-Americans and other foreign tourists came to Pakistan. They explored "heavily painted and decorated trucks and buses" found on the streets of Pakistan. In modern-day, this tradition is merely seen across the country. It primarily originated from Punjab Pakistan.

Economy
Pakistan handicrafts sector is not playing significantly in its economic development. It possibly lacks international marketing assistance and low legislation attention. Crafts in Pakistan, according to News media was listed among the low-earning businesses as compared to other assets. It estimates an amount of $255 million annually. However, it plays a lead role in rural areas, especially among women, who produce several type of crafts in the country. Government of Pakistan has claimed that its handicrafts business is playing a vital role in its economy during the past 15 years. Furniture and textiles are among the key crafts of the country, mostly from Sindh, Punjab.

References

Pakistani handicrafts
Pakistani art
Decorative arts
Pakistani culture
Pakistan